A solvency ratio measures the extent to which assets cover commitments for future payments, the liabilities.

The solvency ratio of an insurance company is the size of its capital relative to all risks it has taken. The solvency ratio is most often defined as:

The solvency ratio is a measure of the risk an insurer faces of claims that it cannot absorb. The amount of premium written is a better measure than the total amount insured because the level of premiums is linked to the likelihood of claims.

Different countries use different methodologies to calculate the solvency ratio, and have different requirements.  For example, in India insurers are required to maintain a minimum ratio of 1.5.

For pension plans, the solvency ratio is the ratio of pension plan assets to liabilities (the pensions to be paid). Another measure of the pension plan's ability to pay all pensions in perpetuity is the going concern ratio, which measures the cost of pensions if the pension plan continues to operate. For the solvency ratio, the pension liabilities are measured using stringent rules including the assumption that the plan will be close immediately so must purchase of annuities to transfer responsibility of the pensions to another party. This is more expensive so the solvency ratio is usually lower than the going concern ratio, which measures the pension plan's ability to pay pensions if it continues to operate.

In finance, the solvency ratio measures a company's cash flow compared to its liabilities:

Solvency ratio = (net income + depreciation) / liabilities

See also 
 Current ratio
 Solvency
 Solvency II Directive 2009 the EU requirement on the ratio

References 

Actuarial science